Yucca tenuistyla is a species of flowering plant in the family Asparagaceae found in brushlands near the coast of Texas, at elevations below 200 m (650 feet).  Common names include white-rimmed yucca and whiterim yucca.

Yucca tenuistyla is a short, acaulescent (trunkless) species forming colonies of rosettes. Leaves can be up to 70 cm (28 inches) long but only 2 cm (0.8 inches) wide. The flowering stalk can be up to 100 cm (33 inches) tall, bearing many pendant flowers. Fruits are dry, with glossy black seeds.

References

External links

North American desert flora
tenuistyla
Flora of Texas
Plants described in 1902